is a Japanese voice actress affiliated with I'm Enterprise.

Biography
Mineuchi was born in Tokyo on December 22, 1997. She gained an interest in voice acting after she was rejected at an audition at a general public call. Mineuchi attended the Japan Narration Actor Institute, a training school for voice actors, while she was studying in high school. 

Mineuchi joined the talent agency I'm Enterprise in 2016. She starred in her first major role as Eiko Tokura in the 2018 anime series Slow Start. Along with co-stars Reina Kondō, Ayasa Itō and Maria Naganawa, she also performed the series' opening theme under the unit name STARTails.

On November 20, 2022, I'm Enterprise announced that Mineuchi was going to quit voice acting on December 31 of the same year.

Filmography

Television animation
2017
 BanG Dream! as Mizuki Namiki
2018
 Slow Start as Eiko Tokura

2019
 Joshi Kausei as Shibumi Shibusawa

2020
 Lapis Re:Lights as Alpha
 The Misfit of Demon King Academy as Carsa Kurnoah
 Is the Order a Rabbit? BLOOM as Kano
 Wandering Witch: The Journey of Elaina as Yuuto

2021
 Scarlet Nexus as Hanabi Ichijo, Alice Ichijo
 Miss Kobayashi's Dragon Maid S as Ilulu

2022
 Slow Loop as Koi Yoshinaga
 Girls' Frontline as UMP45
 Estab Life: Great Escape as Ekua
 Extreme Hearts as Teena Merkies

Original net animation
2017
 Yakiniku-ten Sengoku as Yae Sakura

2018
 Starlight Promises as Kanna

Video games
2017
 Hentai Shōjo: Formation Girls as Elfriede Volva

2018
 Kirara Fantasia as Eiko Tokura, Koi Yoshinaga
 Summer Pockets as Kamome Kushima
 Katana Maidens ~ Toji No Miko: Kizamishi Issen no Tomoshibi as Hina Aoto
 Girls' Frontline as UMP45

2020
 Re:Stage! Prism Step as Haruka Itsumura
 White Cat Project as Perumana

2021
 Uma Musume Pretty Derby as Ines Fujin
 Azur Lane as San Francisco
 Scarlet Nexus as Hanabi Ichijo, Alice Ichijo

2022
 Heaven Burns Red as Hisame Ogasahara
 Lackgirl I as Satsuki

2023
 Fire Emblem Engage as Etie

References

External links
 Official agency profile 
 

1997 births
I'm Enterprise voice actors
Japanese video game actresses
Japanese voice actresses
Living people
Voice actresses from Tokyo